Coroico Municipality is the first municipal section of the Nor Yungas Province in the  La Paz Department, Bolivia. Its seat is Coroico.

See also 
 Illimani
 Kimsa Warmini
 Mururata
 P'iqi Q'ara
 P'iqi Q'ara (in Coroico)

References 

 Instituto Nacional de Estadistica de Bolivia

Municipalities of La Paz Department (Bolivia)